Llantwit Fardre Football Club are an association football club based in the village of Llantwit Fardre near Pontypridd, Wales. The club currently plays in the South Wales Alliance League Second Division, part of the Welsh football league system in South Wales.

Staff and board members

 Vice-Chairman: Robert Stacey
 Secretary : Colin Jones
 Treasurer : Catherine Minton
 Safeguarding Officer : Graham Lane

References

External links
 Official website

Football clubs in Wales
1958 establishments in Wales
Welsh Football League clubs
South Wales Alliance League clubs
South Wales Amateur League clubs
Sport in Rhondda Cynon Taf